Schulthess Buttress is a broad ice-capped bluff between Ricker and Higgins Canyons on the north side of Buckeye Table, Ohio Range, Antarctica. The feature has steep ice and rock cliffs and is prominent when viewed from northward. It was surveyed in December 1958 by the United States Antarctic Research Program (USARP) Horlick Mountains Traverse party. 

The feature was named by the Advisory Committee on Antarctic Names (US-ACAN) for Emil Schulthess, a Swiss photographer who accompanied the party during part of the traverse. He subsequently published a photographic portrait of the continent in his book Antarctica, 1960.

See also
Higgins Canyon

References

Cliffs of Marie Byrd Land